Jarmila Gajdošová and Matthew Ebden were the defending champions, but they lost in the semifinals to Sania Mirza and Horia Tecău.

Kristina Mladenovic and Daniel Nestor won the title, defeating Mirza and Tecău in the final, 6–3, 6–2.

Seeds

Draw

Finals

Top half

Bottom half

References
 Main Draw
 2014 Australian Open – Doubles draws and results at the International Tennis Federation

Mixed Doubles
Australian Open (tennis) by year – Mixed doubles